The  is a park with botanical garden located at Higashi Sakamoto 672, Iwade, Wakayama, Japan. It is open daily except Tuesdays; an admission fee is charged.

The park contains a large tropical greenhouse (fruit trees, bougainvillea, strelitzia, etc.); additional greenhouses for begonia, cactus (about 140 species), and orchid (Cattleya, Cymbidium, and Paphiopedilum); extensive flower plantings; a lotus pond (3,000 m²); and collections of camellia (2,000 m², 80 varieties), hydrangea (2,000 m², 75 varieties, including 35 Japanese varieties), medicinal plants (600 m²), and plum trees (1,000 m², 33 varieties).

See also 
 List of botanical gardens in Japan

References 
 Wakayama Prefecture Botanical Park (Japanese)
 Jardins Botaniques Japonais (French)

Botanical gardens in Japan
Gardens in Wakayama Prefecture